A biogas upgrader is a facility that is used to concentrate the methane in biogas to natural gas standards. The system removes carbon dioxide, hydrogen sulphide, water and contaminants from the biogas. One technique for doing this uses amine gas treating. This purified biogas is also called biomethane. It can be used interchangeably with natural gas.

Raw biogas produced from digestion is roughly 60% methane and 29% CO2 with trace elements of H2S; it is not high quality enough to be used as fuel gas for machinery. The corrosive nature of H2S alone is enough to destroy the internals of a plant.

The solution is the use of biogas upgrading or purification processes whereby contaminants in the raw biogas stream are absorbed or scrubbed, leaving more methane per unit volume of gas. There are four main methods of upgrading: water washing, pressure swing adsorption, selexol adsorbtion, and amine gas treating.

Water washing 

The most prevalent method is water washing whereby high pressure gas flows into a column in which the carbon dioxide and other trace elements are scrubbed by cascading water running counter-flow to the gas. This arrangement can deliver 98% methane with manufacturers guaranteeing maximum 2% methane loss in the system. It takes roughly between 3% and 6% of the total energy output in gas to run a biogas upgrading system

Pressure Swing Adsorption 

A typical PSA system for biogas will have four stages, one each for water vapor, carbon dioxide, nitrogen and oxygen. Gas to be upgraded enters each vessel, is compressed to a high pressure whereby the gas to be removed is adsorbed on to the surface of the adsorbent, and is then decompressed allowing the methane to leave.  The adsorbent is then regenerated.  For oxygen, molecular sieve is used, for nitrogen a zeolite, for carbon dioxide and water a zeolite or activated carbon.

Selexol 

In the Selexol process (now licensed by UOP LLC), the Selexol solvent dissolves (absorbs) the acid gases from the feed gas at relatively high pressure, usually 300 to 2000 psia (2.07 to 13.8 MPa). The rich solvent containing the acid gases is then let down in pressure and/or steam stripped to release and recover the acid gases. The Selexol process can operate selectively to recover hydrogen sulfide and carbon dioxide as separate streams, so that the hydrogen sulfide can be sent to either a Claus unit for conversion to elemental sulfur or to a WSA Process unit for conversion to sulfuric acid while, at the same time, the carbon dioxide can be sequestered or used for enhanced oil recovery.

Selexol is a physical solvent, unlike amine based acid gas removal solvents that rely on a chemical reaction with the acid gases. Since no chemical reactions are involved, Selexol usually requires less energy than the amine based processes. However, at feed gas pressures below about 300 psia(2.07 MPa), the Selexol solvent capacity (in amount of acid gas absorbed per volume of solvent) is reduced and the amine based processes will usually be superior.

Amine gas treater

H2S or both H2S and CO2 can be removed with this technology.

The chemistry involved in the amine treating of such gases varies somewhat with the particular amine being used. For one of the more common amines, monoethanolamine (MEA) denoted as RNH2, the chemistry may be expressed as:

RNH2 + H2S  RNH + SH−

A typical amine gas treating process includes an absorber unit and a regenerator unit .  In the absorber, the downflowing amine solution absorbs H2S and CO2 from the upflowing sour gas to produce a gas stream  free of hydrogen sulfide and carbon dioxide as a product and an amine solution rich in the absorbed acid gases.  The resultant "rich" amine is then routed into the regenerator (a stripper with a reboiler) to produce regenerated or "lean" amine that is recycled for reuse in the absorber. The stripped overhead gas from the regenerator is concentrated H2S and CO2.

Membrane-based Gas Permeation Systems 

Membrane-based biogas upgrading systems utilize the different permeabilities of gases through a membrane fiber. As biogas passes through a dense polymeric membrane, CO2 is prevented from through-flow and removed, while CH4 passes through. 
Membrane-based gas permeation systems consume only electrical power, but do not require any chemicals or water. In order to achieve higher methane contents (up to 99% methane) in the final gas, the gas passes through serial groups of membranes. Since membranes are sensitive to water and other impurities in biogas, gas permeation/membrane systems require efficient pre-treatment (especially H2S and water removal).

Objectives and variants 

A distinction can be drawn between the basic treatment of  raw biogas, which is necessary for example for use in a biogas CHP plant, and the more elaborate treatment needed to obtain natural gas quality (biomethane).
The above table shows the composition of raw biogas after primary treatment and biomethane. The fractions of crude biogas can vary greatly, depending on substrate, plant design, and other factors. The nature of the biomethane is adapted to the corresponding qualities of natural gas.

Biogas is used mostly directly in a biogas cogeneration plant. This requires desulfurization and drying in order to avoid corrosion in the CHP. To be able to feed biogas into the natural gas network or for fuel use,  a more comprehensive treatment is necessary.  In addition to drying and desulfurization the carbon dioxide must be removed and chemical conditioning to obtain properties meeting the specifications for natural gas. This biomethane can be injected into the natural gas network and converted to electricity and heat through CHP at a place where the heat can be used, such as a  swimming pool, which has a year-round high heat demand.

Use of the natural gas 'grid' also permits retail customers to purchase a certain proportion of biomethane gas in their gas supply contracts.

See also
Anaerobic digestion

References

Anaerobic digestion
Biogas technology
Gas technologies